International Review for the Sociology of Sport is a peer-reviewed academic journal that publishes papers in the field of Sociology. The journal is edited by Lawrence Wenner, Von der Ahe Professor of Communication & Ethics at Loyola Marymount University, who replaced John Sugden (University of Brighton) in 2012. Dominic Malcolm took over as editor in 2018.

Scope 
International Review for the Sociology of Sport solely focuses on the global dissemination of research on sport within Sociology, sport studies, anthropology, cultural studies and across the social sciences. The interdisciplinary journal publishes standard research papers, research notes and book reviews in the field and is not restricted to a theoretical or methodological perspective.

Abstracting and indexing 
International Review for the Sociology of Sport is abstracted and indexed in, among other databases:  SCOPUS, and the Social Sciences Citation Index. According to the Journal Citation Reports, its 2015 impact factor was 1.341, ranking it 41 out of 142 journals in the category ‘Sociology’ and 18 out of 44 journals in the category ‘Hospitality, Leisure, Sport & Tourism’.

References

External links 
 
 ISSA Official Website

SAGE Publishing academic journals
English-language journals
Publications established in 1966
Bimonthly journals